Abel is an EP released by Unsraw on August 29, 2007. It is part of a dual-album release campaign with Kein. The pair of EPs are named after the biblical story of Cain and Abel.

Track listing
"Social Faker" – 4:18
"Starving Moon" – 3:26
"Platonic Bitch" – 3:59
"Drain" – 3:48
"Sakura no Namida" (桜の涙) – 4:48

Notes
 "Starving Moon" was previously featured on the single "Lustful Days".

Unsraw albums
2007 EPs